ShopRite, Shoprite, Shop Rite or Shop-Rite may refer to:

 Shop-Rite (Canada), a Canadian catalogue store that operated from the 1970s to 1982
 Shoprite (Isle of Man), the Manx food retailer that once traded in the United Kingdom
 Shoprite (South Africa), the South African food distributor
 ShopRite (United States), the retailers' cooperative (co-op) chain of supermarkets in the northeastern U.S.